On May 27, 2020, after 11 a.m., a 38-year-old African-American transgender man, Tony McDade, was fatally shot in the Leon Arms apartment complex by an officer of the Tallahassee Police Department, following the fatal stabbing of Malik Jackson on nearby Saxon Street. Early reports of the incident misgendered McDade as a "woman", and on May 28, the police department described McDade as a woman who "identified as a man". On September 3, a Leon County grand jury found that the police use of force against McDade was justified. Police body camera showing McDade pointing a firearm at one of the police officers before being shot was also released.

McDade is a suspect in Jackson's fatal stabbing and police stated that McDade pointed a gun at police and that a bloody knife was found at the scene. Some witnesses have contradicted statements by the Police Department that McDade was armed with a gun. The officer also allegedly called McDade the N-word before shooting and killing him.

People involved 
 Malik Jackson, a 21-year-old African-American man, who was fatally stabbed.
 Tony McDade, a 38-year-old African-American trans man. On the morning of the incidents, McDade stated on a Facebook Live video that he would get revenge on some men who had attacked him the day before. His funeral took place on June 6.
 An officer of the Tallahassee Police Department, whose identity was withheld under a controversial application of Florida law, who was placed on administrative leave following the incident, which is common practice with officer involved shootings in the United States.

Background 
In 2020, McDade entered into a relationship with Jennifer Jackson, a neighbor of his who was the mother of Malik Jackson. According to her family members, McDade entered Jackson's home on May 25 and pistol-whipped her. On May 26, McDade returned to Jackson's home and allegedly became verbally abusive. This led to a physical altercation with Malik Jackson and other members of Jackson's family.
Early on May 27, McDade went live on Facebook to recount being jumped by a group of men, which had been a one-on-one fight before an insult caused four others to join, and vowed revenge. McDade stated he had weapons and planned to fight one of the men;

He detailed his wounds from the altercation which included a bloody elbow and two lumps on his head. He potentially alludes to an attempted suicide by cop or gun fight with the man;

Killing 
According to the Tallahassee Police Department they approached McDade on May 27, as a suspect in the fatal stabbing of Malik Jackson earlier in the day. The Department Police Chief Lawrence Revelle told reporters that; "the suspect was in possession of a handgun, and a bloody knife was found at the scene" and that McDade had pointed a gun at the responding officer. The officer reported this information over the department's radio frequency.

Witnesses have disputed this, claiming that officers said "Stop moving, nigger!" and then shot McDade after he stopped moving. The witnesses also claim that officers never identified themselves or told McDade initially to stop his actions.

Investigations
On May 27, investigations were launched into the stabbing incident, and the officer involved in the subsequent shooting. The officer was placed on administrative leave pending the investigation.

On September 3, a Leon County grand jury found that the police use of force against McDade was justified. Shortly afterward, the City of Tallahassee released video from a police body camera showing McDade pointing a firearm at one of the police officers before being shot.

After the shooting, the Florida Police Benevolent Association sued the city of Tallahassee to block the shooting officer's name from becoming public, citing Marsy’s Law, which grants privacy rights to victims of crime. In April 2021, the police union emerged victorious: a Florida appellate court ruled that cops who kill civilians can now have their identities legally protected.

Reactions 

Separate vigils took place for both victims on May 28. McDade's was organized by the Tallahassee Community Action Committee, to draw attention to the three police-related deaths (McDade, Wilbon Cleveland Woodard, and Mychael Johnson), since Lawrence Revell assumed the office of Chief of Police in December 2019.

On May 27, a petition was created to publicize the case, and for McDade to be recognised as a transgender man in reports and official statements.

On May 29, Tori Cooper of the LGBTQ advocacy group Human Rights Campaign, said "LGBTQ people of color are at greater risk for violence every day in this country. This must end. Our hearts are heavy as we mourn with Tony's family and friends." Over 100 LGBTQ Organizations included McDade in a list of recent transgender killings.

A GoFundMe.com campaign raised over $190,000 for McDade's family in its first week.

Activist Nicole Cardoza expressed concern that McDade's shooting had received insufficient attention from the Black Lives Matter movement writing, "Throughout the protests, the stories, Black trans people who were victims of police violence, like Tony McDade, got lost in the larger conversation around Black Lives Matter."

References 

2020 controversies in the United States
2020 in Florida
2020s in Florida
African-American history of Florida
African-American-related controversies
Tallahassee, Florida
Black Lives Matter
Violence against trans men
Law enforcement controversies in the United States
Deaths by firearm in Florida
Deaths by person in Florida
May 2020 events in the United States
2020 deaths
African Americans shot dead by law enforcement officers in the United States
History of racism in Florida
Law enforcement in Florida
LGBT African Americans
Transgender men